This is a list of awards and nominations received by the American science fiction television series, The X-Files.

American Cinema Editors

American Society of Cinematographers 
The ASC Awards are presented annually by the American Society of Cinematographers, honoring the best cinematographers of film and television. The X-Files received two awards out of ten nominations.

Directors Guild of America

Emmy Awards

Primetime Emmy Awards 
3 wins out of 21 nominations

Creative Emmy Awards 
13 wins out of 40 nominations

Golden Globe Awards 
5 wins out of 12 nominations

Satellite Awards 
2 wins out of 9 nominations

Saturn Awards

Screen Actors Guild 
2 wins out of 14 nominations

Television Critics Association Awards 
9 nominations

Writers Guild of America 
2 nominations

Young Artist Awards 
1 win out of 2 nominations

References

External links
 Awards on TheXFiles.com

X-Files, The
Awards and nominations